LY-2183240 is a drug which acts both as a potent inhibitor of the reuptake of the endocannabinoid anandamide and as an inhibitor of fatty acid amide hydrolase (FAAH), the primary enzyme responsible for degrading anandamide. This leads to markedly elevated anandamide levels in the brain, and LY-2183240 has been shown to produce both analgesic and anxiolytic effects in animal models. While LY-2183240 is a potent inhibitor of FAAH, it has relatively poor selectivity and also inhibits several other enzyme side targets. Consequently, it was never developed for clinical use, though it remains widely used in research, and has also been sold as a designer drug.

See also
Endocannabinoid reuptake inhibitor
 FAAH inhibitor
 BIA 10-2474
 PF-04457845
 URB-597

References

Further reading

Cannabinoids
Endocannabinoid reuptake inhibitors
Eli Lilly and Company brands
Designer drugs
Tetrazoles